The Blackwater River is a  river in Aroostook County, Maine. From the confluence of its North Branch and South Branch in Squa Pan Township (Township 10, Range 4, WELS. The river runs west to St. Croix Stream in Masardis. Via St. Croix Stream and the Aroostook River, the Blackwater River is part of the Saint John River watershed.

See also
List of rivers of Maine

References

External links

Maine Streamflow Data from the USGS
Maine Watershed Data From Environmental Protection Agency

Tributaries of the Saint John River (Bay of Fundy)
Rivers of Aroostook County, Maine